Agata Edgarovna Muceniece (Priluchnaya) (born 1 March 1989) is a Latvian actress and model, and television presenter.

Life and career
Muceniece was born in Riga, Latvia in 1989. Her father was Latvian, her mother is Russian (both born in USSR). She has two older sisters Renata and Santa. Muceniece studied at the University of Latvia where she gained degree in Chinese philology. She then studied at the Russian State Film Institute in Moscow, Russia. She first gained fame in the television series "Closed School". She has also featured in projects such as "Secret City", "Kvest", "Three Musketeers".

Muceniece became a co-presenter of the Russian TV show, The Voice Kids in its fifth season.

Personal life
Muceniece married Russian actor Pavel Priluchny on 19 July 2011. They have a son Timofey (born 2013), and a daughter Mia (born 2016), in Moscow, Russia.

On 15 June 2020, the couple divorced after nine years of marriage due to domestic violence from Pavel's side.

She has kept her ex-husband's last name Priluchnaya in official documents, however, her stage name is Muceniece.

In February 2022, she publicly spoke on the situation in Ukraine during the 2022 Russian invasion of Ukraine requesting an end to the war.

References

External links
 

1989 births
Living people
Actors from Riga
Models from Riga
Writers from Riga
Latvian film actresses
Latvian television actresses
Latvian emigrants to Russia
Russian film actresses
Russian television actresses
University of Latvia alumni
Russian activists against the 2022 Russian invasion of Ukraine